Michael Barry Murphy  (born January 25, 1958) is a New Brunswick lawyer and politician.

Biography 
Murphy graduated from Moncton High School in 1976, from the University of New Brunswick with a Bachelor of Business Administration in 1980 and a Bachelor of Laws in 1983.  He received his Master of Laws from Osgoode Hall Law School in 2002.

A personal injury lawyer, Murphy was president of the New Brunswick Liberal Association from 1988-1993.

In 2001, Murphy considered running for the leadership of the New Brunswick Liberal Party, but dropped out after forming an early campaign team. He supported Shawn Graham, the eventual winner.

He was first elected to the Legislative Assembly of New Brunswick in the 2003 election, the only Liberal to win a seat in Moncton.  Following the election, he was named as opposition critic for the Department of Family and Community Services, a post he held until being elevated to finance critic in early 2005.

He was re-elected in the 2006 election and joined the cabinet as Minister of Health.

In June 2009, Murphy became the Attorney General and Justice Minister.  He resigned from cabinet in January 2010 to spend more time with his family and return to practising law. At the time, Murphy said the decision had nothing to do with the government, but later admitted that he did quit over NB Power, but said he felt it was more honourable to not say so at the time. In early 2010, Murphy took a partner position at the law firm of Cox and Palmer in Moncton. In 2011 he formed his own firm which has expanded to over a dozen employees. In 2022, it was re-branded as the Mike Murphy Law Group.

New Brunswick Liberal Association leadership election, 2012 
On January 5, 2012, Murphy announced he was entering the race for the leadership of the New Brunswick Liberal Party. In October 2012, at the leadership convention, Murphy was defeated on the first ballot by Brian Gallant.
In the leadership race Murphy was labeled "establishment" when ironically Brian Gallant was later realized to have been their candidate having received support of Dominic Leblanc MP, former Premier Ray Frenette and other past key party hierarchy.

Notes

References
 
 

1958 births
Living people
Members of the Executive Council of New Brunswick
New Brunswick Liberal Association MLAs
People from Moncton
21st-century Canadian politicians
Attorneys General of New Brunswick
Canadian King's Counsel